The Gryazev-Shipunov GSh-30-1 (also known by the GRAU index designation 9A-4071K) is a 30 mm autocannon designed for use on Soviet and later Russian military aircraft, entering service in the early 1980s. Its current manufacturer is the Russian company JSC Izhmash. The name GSH-30-1 is formed from the surnames of the designers Gryazev (Грязев) and Shipunov (Шипунов), the caliber of 30 mm and the single-barrel design of the gun itself.

Description
The GSh-30-1 is a single-barreled, recoil operated autocannon weighing 46 kg (101 lb). Unlike many postwar cannons, it uses a short recoil action instead of a revolver cannon or Gatling gun mechanism. This results in a reduced rate of fire, but lower weight and bulk.

The GSh-30-1 has a rate of fire of 1,800 rounds per minute, customarily limited to 1,500 rounds per minute to reduce barrel wear. Despite that, its barrel life is quite short: 2,000 rounds, with a continuous burst rated for 150 rounds. The gun uses an evaporation cooling system to prevent the detonation of a high explosive round inside a heated barrel. This cooling system consists of a cylindrical water tank around the rear end of the barrel. The GSh-30-1 is equipped with a unique pyrotechnic mechanism to clear misfires: a small pyrotechnic cartridge is located to the left of the 30mm cartridge chamber. This pyrotechnic cartridge fires a small steel bolt through the side wall of the 30mm cartridge. The hot propellant gases following the bolt into the dud 30mm round ignite the powder charge of that round and firing continues.

The gun's maximum effective range against aerial targets is 200 to 800 m and against surface or ground targets is 1,200 to 1,800 m.

In combination with a laser rangefinding/targeting system, it is reported to be extremely accurate as well as powerful, capable of destroying a target with as few as three to five rounds. It has been deployed on several different types of fighter aircraft:

 Su-27, Su-30, Su-33, Su-34, Su-35 and Su-37: 1 GSh-30-1 in starboard wing root (150 rds. ammunition load)
 Su-57: 1 GSh-30-1 in right LEVCON root
 MiG-29: 1 GSh-30-1 in port wing root (150 rds. ammunition load)
 Yak-141: 1 GSh-30-1 on the belly (120 rds. ammunition load)
 Shenyang J-11, Shenyang J-15, Shenyang J-16: 1 GSh-30-1 in starboard wing root (150 rds. ammunition load)
 9A4273 gun pod: 1 GSh-30-1 flexibly mounted, pod weight 480 kg (150 rds. ammunition load)

Operational history

During the 2022 Russian invasion of Ukraine, Ukraine confirmed that Colonel Ihor Bedzay, the deputy head of the Ukrainian Navy, was killed when his Mi-14 was shot down by a Russian Su-35.  This cannon was used by a Russian Su-35 to try and shoot down the Mi-14Ps however the helicopter appears to have evaded it, then the Su-35 has fired a missile.

Ammunition
The 30x165 mm rounds, fitted with distance-armed and delayed action fuze, are commonly fired from the GSh-30-1. This type of ammunition is intended to engage air and ground targets. The 30x165 mm round can have several projectiles. Its variants are:
 Armour-piercing tracer (AP-T)
 Armour-piercing incendiary tracer (API-T)
 Semi armor-piercing high explosive (SAPHEI)
 Inert armour-piercing (AP Inert)
 High explosive tracer (HE-T)
 Short range high explosive tracer (HE-T-SR)
 Inert high explosive tracer (HE-T Inert)
 High explosive Incendiary (HEI)
 High explosive incendiary tracer (HEI-T)
 Multielement kinetic energy time fuze (MKETF)
 Target practice (RTP)
 Target practice tracer (RTP-T)

Users
 Algeria
 Azerbaijan
 Angola
 Bulgaria
 Cameroon
 China
 Cuba
 India
 Indonesia
 Iran
 Iraq
 North Korea
 Malaysia
 Peru
 Poland
 Russia
 Serbia
 Slovakia
 Soviet Union (passed on to successor states)
 Sudan
 Syria
 Uganda
 Yemen
 Venezuela

See also
 List of Russian weaponry

References

 Yefim Gordon. Yakovlev Yak-36, Yak-38 & Yak-41: / The Soviet 'Jump Jets' / Translation by Dmitriy Komissarov. — Hinckley, England, UK: Midland Publishing, 2008. — P. 130–131. 

Artillery of Russia
30 mm artillery
Aircraft guns of the Soviet Union
Autocannons of the Soviet Union
Izhevsk machine-building plant products
Military equipment introduced in the 1980s